Toura may be:
Toura language (Ivory Coast)
Toura language (Papua New Guinea)